Anabell Rivero Blanco (born July 10, 1968) is a Venezuelan model and actress who was born in Caracas on July 10, 1968. Since she began her career, she has participated in various telenovelas.

Telenovelas
 Volver a Vivir (1996) as Zorayda
 Los amores de Anita Peña (1996)
 La Llaman Mariamor (1996)
 Niña Mimada (1997)
 Cuando Hay Pasion (1999) as Michelle Adriana Malavé Betancourt
 Muñeca de trapo (2000) as Ana Karina Ballesteros
 Lejana como el viento (2000) as Tatiana
 Viva la Pepa (2001) as Celina Requena
 Amor Del Bueno (2004) as Eliana
 Voltea pa' que te enamores (2007) as Betzaida "Betzaidita" Conde (La Talla Cero)
 Torrente (2008) as Valeria Velutini
 ¿Dónde está Elisa? (2012) as María Antonia León
 Dulce Amargo (2012) as Cristina Malavé

References

External links
 

1968 births
Actresses from Caracas
Venezuelan telenovela actresses
Living people